Rosita may refer to:

Places
 Rosita, Nicaragua, a municipality
 Rosita Airport, an airport that serves Rosita, Nicaragua
 La Rosita, Texas
 Rosita, Colorado
 Rosita North, Texas
 Rosita, Texas, formerly named Rosita South
 Nueva Rosita, a Mexican town often simply called Rosita
 Roşiţa, a village in Albota de Sus Commune, Taraclia district, Moldova

People 
 Rosita (given name), a given name (including a list of people with the name)
 Thea Trinidad (born 1990), American wrestler with the ring name Rosita

Characters
 Rosita (Doctor Who), a one-off companion in Doctor Who
 Rosita (Sesame Street), a Muppet character on the children's TV series Sesame Street
 Rosita Espinosa, a character on the television series The Walking Dead
 Rosita, a character in the 2016 animated film Sing

Other uses
 Rosita (band)
 Rosita (film), a 1923 silent film
 Cyclone Rosita, a 2000 tropical cyclone
 Rosita, a follower of Argentinean caudillo Juan Manuel de Rosas
 Rosita, the name of Joey Tribbiani's chair in Friends
 "La Rosita", a song by Gabriel Dupont (1878–1914)

See also
 Reseda (disambiguation)
 Santa Rosita  (disambiguation)
 Rosita Harbour